Henry Mittlestadt (1911–1987), best known by his ring name, Tiny Mills, was a Canadian professional wrestler born in Camrose, Alberta. He often teamed with his brother Al Mills as the tag team Murder Incorporated (Murder Inc.). Later on Stan "Krusher" Kowalski would replace Al Mills as part of Murder Incorporated.

Career
Mills started his wrestling career at the Maple Leaf Gardens in 1953. Teaming with his brother Al Mills, they were billed as "Murder Incorporated." Al and  Tiny won Toronto's NWA Canadian Open Tag Team Championship in the debut year, defeating the Canadian dream team of Whipper Billy Watson and Yvon Robert. They drew huge houses at Maple Leaf Gardens that year. They traded the Championship with Watson and Hombre Montana as well as Ernie and Emil Dusek in 1954 and won the Championship once more in 1955, which was also the year Al made his final wrestling appearance in Toronto. After the deal of Al Mills Tiny decided to find a new partner and reform Murder Inc. in the late 1950s. He decided to team up with Minneapolis native Stan "Krusher" Kowalski. Team won the Minneapolis version of the NWA World Tag Team Championships twice while working for the NWA Minneapolis Wrestling and Boxing Club. When that promotion became the American Wrestling Association in 1960, Mills and Kowalski became the first AWA World Tag Team Champions. Mills not only worked in tag teams but as a singles wrestler as well. In 1960, Mills had a Championship match against NWA World Champion Pat O'Connor at Maple Leaf Gardens. Together with Kowalski, Tiny Mills once again won the Canadian Open Tag Team Championship, defeating Watson and Ilio DiPaolo on the last Maple Leaf Gardens show of 1960. They lost the Championship early in 1961 after which Mills never came back to Toronto again. After retirement, Tiny became a sheriff in Minnesota.

Championships and accomplishments
50th State Big Time Wrestling
NWA Hawaii Tag Team Championship (1 time) – with Stan Kowalski
Alex Turk Promotions
Manitoba Tag Team Championship (1 time) - with Al Mills
Central States Wrestling
NWA World Tag Team Championship (Central States version) (2 times) – with Al Mills (1), Pat O'Connor (1)
Maple Leaf Wrestling
NWA Canadian Open Tag Team Championship (6 times) – with Al Mills (5) and Stan Kowalski (1)
Mid-Atlantic Championship Wrestling
NWA Southern Tag Team Championship (Mid-Atlantic version) (1 time) – with Jim Austeri
NWA Mid-America
NWA Southern Tag Team Championship (Mid-America version) (1 time) – with Jim Austeri
NWA San Francisco
NWA World Tag Team Championship (San Francisco version) (1 time) – with Hombre Montana
NWA Minneapolis Wrestling and Boxing Club / American Wrestling Association
AWA World Tag Team Championship (1 time) – with Stan Kowalski
NWA World Tag Team Championship (Minneapolis version) (2 times) – with Stan Kowalski
Southwest Sports, Inc.
NWA Texas Tag Team Championship (1 time) – with Duke Keomuka
Stampede Wrestling
NWA Canadian Tag Team Championship (Calgary version) (2 times) – with Al Mills
NWA International Tag Team Championship (Calgary version) (1 time) – with Jack Daniels
Other titles
North Dakota Heavyweight Championship (1 time)

References

External links
Canadian Pro Wrestling Page of Fame - Al and Tiny Mills

1911 births
1987 deaths
Canadian male professional wrestlers
People from Camrose, Alberta
Professional wrestlers from Alberta
20th-century professional wrestlers
AWA World Tag Team Champions
NWA Canadian Open Tag Team Champions
NWA Canadian Tag Team Champions (Calgary version)
Stampede Wrestling International Tag Team Champions